This page is a singles discography for the musician Mike Oldfield.

Singles

Extended plays

Other singles

Notes

References

External links 
 Mike Oldfield Discography at Tubular.net
 Mike Oldfield Discography at Amadian.net
 
 Argiers – Mike Oldfield's collector corner, includes Rainer-Muenz's lists

Singles Discography
Oldfield, Mike (singles)
Discographies of British artists